The Comedy Annual is a British entertainment comedy series that first aired on ITV on 22 December 2010. Presented by Phillip Schofield, it features various comedians who talk about unusual events of the past year. There have been two episodes, the first airing in 2010 and the second in 2011.

Episodes

References

External links

2010 British television series debuts
2011 British television series endings
2010s British comedy television series
British comedy television shows
ITV (TV network) original programming
English-language television shows